Kolesnik, Kolesnyk, Kolisnyk, or Kalesnik is a gender-neutral occupational surname meaning "wheelwright" in several Slavic languages. In its various forms, it is particularly common in Ukraine.

Variations
 Ukraine: Колесник or Колісник (Kolesnyk, Kolisnyk; less common: Kolesnik, Kolisnik)
 Belarus: Калеснік (Kalesnik)
 Russia: Колесник (Kolesnik)
 Poland: Koleśnik
 Moldova/Romania: Colesnic
 Other: Kolesnick

People

Kolesnik
 Aleksey Kolesnik (born 1999), Belarusian footballer
 Alyona Kolesnik (born 1995), Ukrainian-Azerbaijani freestyle wrestler
 Andrey Kolesnik (born 1960), Russian politician
 Finn Kolesnik (born 2000), Canadian World Bridge Champion
 Magdalena Koleśnik (born 1990), Polish actress
 Vadim Kolesnik (born 1969), Ukrainian hammer thrower
 Vadym Kolesnik (born 2001), Ukrainian-born ice dancer
 Vitali Kolesnik (born 1979), Kazakhstani ice hockey goaltender

Kolesnyk
 Danylo Kolesnyk (born 2001), Ukrainian footballer
 Vadym Kolesnyk (born 1967), Ukrainian footballer
 Yuliia Kolesnyk (born 1997), Ukrainian sprint canoeist

Kolisnyk
 Art Kolisnyk (1921–1996), Canadian football player
 Mykola Kolisnyk (born 1988), Ukrainian statesman

Kalesnik
 Sergey Kalesnik (born 1970), Belarusian sprint canoeist
 Stanislav Kalesnik (1901–1977), Soviet glaciologist

Colesnic
 Iurie Colesnic (born 1955), Moldovan politician

See also
 
 
 
 
 Kolesnikov

Belarusian-language surnames
Polish-language surnames
Ukrainian-language surnames